Streptomyces thermoautotrophicus is a thermophilic bacterium species from the genus of Streptomyces. Streptomyces thermoautotrophicus was claimed to be diazotrophic and to produce a new kind of nitrogenase, but new evidence suggests that it can't fix N2 gas.

See also 
 List of Streptomyces species

References

Further reading

External links
Type strain of Streptomyces thermoautotrophicus at BacDive -  the Bacterial Diversity Metadatabase

thermoautotrophicus
Bacteria described in 1991